Semir Tuce (born 11 February 1964) is a Bosnian retired footballer, who played as left winger.

He was part of the Velež Mostar second golden era, which won the 1985–86 Yugoslav Cup.

Club career

Velež Mostar
Tuce was born in Mostar and started to play professionally for FK Velež Mostar in 1983, and became one of their best players. He would shoot with his left foot, and was noted in the Yugoslav First League. During his career in Velež, he played 177 league games and scored 55 goals. In 1986, he won the Yugoslav Cup with Velež. The same year, in 1986, he was named the Yugoslav Footballer of the Year.

Luzern
In 1989, he moved to Switzerland to play for FC Luzern. He played in Switzerland for 5 years. He won the Swiss Cup with the club in 1992. He ended his career at Luzern in 1995.

International career
Tuce made his debut for Yugoslavia in an October 1986 European Championship qualification match against Turkey and has earned a total of 7 caps, scoring 2 goals. His final international was an April 1989 friendly match against Greece.

International goals 
''Scores and results table. Yugoslavia's goal tally first:

Personal life
On 22 April 2021 Tuce was hit by a heart attack in his hometown Kriens, in Switzerland.

Honours

Player
Velež Mostar
Yugoslav Cup: 1985–86

Luzern
Swiss Cup: 1991–92

Individual
Awards
Yugoslav Footballer of the Year: 1986

References

External links

1964 births
Living people
Sportspeople from Mostar
Association football wingers
Yugoslav footballers
Yugoslavia international footballers
Olympic footballers of Yugoslavia
Footballers at the 1988 Summer Olympics
Bosnia and Herzegovina footballers
FK Velež Mostar players
FC Luzern players
Yugoslav First League players
Swiss Super League players
Swiss Challenge League players
Yugoslav expatriate footballers
Bosnia and Herzegovina expatriate footballers
Expatriate footballers in Switzerland
Yugoslav expatriate sportspeople in Switzerland
Bosnia and Herzegovina expatriate sportspeople in Switzerland